Rabban Hormizd Monastery is an important monastery of the Chaldean Catholic Church, founded about 640 AD, carved out in the mountains about 2 miles from Alqosh, Iraq, 28 miles north of Mosul. It was the official residence of the patriarchs of the Eliya line of the Assyrian Church of the East from 1551 to the 18th century, and after the union with Rome in the early 19th century, it became a prominent monastery of the Chaldean Catholic Church.

The monastery is named after Rabban Hormizd (rabban is the Syriac for monk) of the Church of the East,  who founded it in the seventh century.

History of the monastery

Because of the fame of Rabban Hormizd, the monastery he founded became extremely important for the Church of the East. It flourished until the 10th century. Already, before the end of the 15th century, the Rabban Hormizd Monastery served as the patriarchal burial site. Yohannan Sulaqa was monk of the Rabban Hormizd Monastery before his travel to Rome to become the first Patriarch of the Chaldean Catholic Church.

Between 1551 and the 18th century, the monastery became the official residence of the patriarchs of the Eliya line of the Church of the East, which was the oldest and largest patriarchal See of the Church of the East, the only one existing patriarchal line before the Sulaqa's 1553 split. Nine patriarchal graves, from 1497 to 1804, are still located in the corridor that leads to the cell of Rabban Hormizd. In about 1743, due to pestilence and the attacks of the Kurds, at the beginning of the Ottoman-Persian War (1743-1746). After that, the monastery was left mainly unmanned. 

In 1808, the Assyrian Gabriel Dambo (1775-1832) revived the abandoned monastery, rebuilt it, collected a number  of pupils vowed to poverty and celibacy, and installed there a seminary. At first this initiative was opposed by Yohannan VIII Hormizd, then Archbishop of Mosul, even if it was supported by the patriarchal administrator Augustine Hindi. Patriarch Joseph Audo, before he was appointed the bishop of Mosul, was himself a monk of Rabban Hormizd monastery.

Gabriel Dambo was murdered in 1832 by the soldiers of Mohammed Pasha, the Kurdish emir of Rawandouz. In 1838, the monastery of Rabban Hormizd and the town of Alqosh were attacked by the Kurds of Soran and hundreds of Assyrian Chaldeans died and in the 1843 the Kurds started to collect as much money as they could from Christian villages, killing those who refused: more than ten thousand Christians were killed and the icons of the Rabban Hormizd monastery defaced.

The library of the convent of Rabban Hormizd was rich in Syriac manuscripts. In 1828, many of these manuscripts were looted and broken up by Moussa Pasha, who had imitated the emir of Rawandouz in revolting against the Turks. In 1868, 147 volumes, manuscripts and prints, suffered the same treatment from Ismael Pasha, the successor of Moussa Pasha. The monks went on anyway to buy and copy manuscripts, thus forming an important library.

Description of the monastery in 1890

E. A. Wallis Budge, who visited Rabban Hormizd Monastery in 1890, describes the monastery with these words:

The new monastery

The monastery of Rabban Hormizd was too exposed to attack to remain a functioning monastery, and was also a symbol of a turbulent time. Patriarch Joseph Audo decided to replace it, and in 1859, with financial assistance from the Vatican, built a new monastery of Notre Dame des Semences (Our Lady of the Seeds) in a safer plain site near Alqosh, about one mile from the ancient monastery. The new monastery quickly replaced Rabban Hormizd as the principal monastery of the Chaldean Church, and most of the monks moved to the new location.

Notes

Sources

External links
Photos and Article about the Rabban Hormizd monastery - Kaldaya.net

Monasteries of the Church of the East
Christianity in Nineveh Governorate
Eastern Catholic monasteries in Iraq
Christian monasteries established in the 7th century
Chaldean Catholic monasteries
Cave monasteries